Usha Vidyarthi is an Indian politician. She was elected to the Bihar Legislative Assembly from Paliganj constituency in Bihar in the 2015 Bihar Legislative Assembly election as a member of the Bharatiya Janata Party. She joined Lok Janashakti Party ahead of 2020 Bihar Legislative Assembly election.

References

Living people
Bharatiya Janata Party politicians from Bihar
People from Patna
Bihar MLAs 2010–2015
Year of birth missing (living people)
Lok Janshakti Party politicians